USS McFaul (DDG-74) is an  in the United States Navy. She is named for U.S. Navy SEAL Chief Petty Officer Donald L. McFaul. This ship is the 24th destroyer of her class. USS McFaul was the 11th ship of this class to be built at Ingalls Shipbuilding in Pascagoula, Mississippi, and construction began on 26 January 1996. She was launched on 18 January 1997 and was christened on 12 April 1997. On 25 April 1998 she had her commissioning ceremony at the Garden City Terminal in Savannah, Georgia.  As of July 2020 the ship is part of Destroyer Squadron 26 based out of Naval Station Norfolk.

Service history
Both ships suffered minor damage, and no injuries were reported. Both ships returned to their homeport at Naval Station Norfolk under their own power.

On 16 February 2007, McFaul was awarded the 2006 Battle "E" award.

On 24 August 2008, McFaul arrived in Batumi, Georgia, as part of Operation Assured Delivery to "deliver humanitarian relief supplies ... as part of the larger United States response to the government of Georgia request for humanitarian assistance"  in the wake of the 2008 Russo-Georgian war.

On 5 April 2010, McFaul responded to a distress call from the merchant vessel MV Rising Sun after she was attacked by pirates. McFaul was able to neutralize the threat, and captured ten suspected pirates and successfully rescued eight crewmembers from on board a dhow near Salalah, Oman. The pirates were then transferred to the destroyer  for a week before they were transferred back to McFaul where 30 days later they were turned over to the Somali Transitional Federal Government for subsequent prosecution.

On 12 September 2012, McFaul was ordered to the coast of Libya in what the Pentagon called a "contingency" in case a strike was ordered. This was in response to the 2012 diplomatic missions attacks.

Awards
 Navy Unit Commendation – (Sep – Nov 2001, Mar – Aug 2004, Feb – Sep 2012)
 Navy Meritorious Unit Commendation – (Jan 1999 – Sep 2001, Jul – Sep 2001, May – Nov 2006)
 Battle "E" – (2000, 2002, 2003, 2004, 2006, 2011, 2012, 2015, 2019)
 Humanitarian Service Medal – (Sep – Oct 1998)
 Captain Edward F. Ney Memorial Award Small-Medium Afloat Category - (2021)

Upgrade
On 12 November 2009, the Missile Defense Agency announced that McFaul would be upgraded during fiscal 2013 to RIM-161 Standard Missile 3 (SM-3) capability in order to function as part of the Aegis Ballistic Missile Defense System.

Coat of arms

Shield 
The shield has background of dark blue with Neptune being pulled by seahorses in a chariot over sea waves.

The traditional Navy colors were chosen for the shield because dark blue and gold represents the sea and excellence respectively. Neptune, God of the Sea, symbolizes maritime prowess and swift mobilization. Waves represent the coastline and highlight Chief Petty Officer McFaul's enclosure from sea by rubber raiding craft to block General Noriega's escape from Panama.

Crest 
The crest consists of the shape of an array with a gold cross center. The array is split into quarters with palm leaves surrounding.

The crests AEGIS shape highlights the USS McFAUL's modern multi-mission warfare operations. The cross honors the Navy Cross awarded to Platoon Chief Petty Officer Donald L. McFaul for extraordinary heroism in action under fire and saving his teammate's life. The quarter colored crest are adapted from the Panamanian flag to represent operation "Just Cause" in the Republic of Panama. The quartered sections also honor McFaul's SEAL team, SEAL Team Four. The laurel symbolizes achievement and honor. The palm indicates to the location of Panama while symbolizing victory.

Motto 
The motto is written on a scroll of blue that has a gold reverse side.

The ships motto is "Courage Honor Sacrifice".

Seal 
The coat of arms in full color as in the blazon, upon a white background enclosed within a dark blue oval border edged on the outside with a gold rope and bearing the inscription "USS McFAUL" at the top and "DDG 74" in the base all gold.

References

External links

 Official site
 

 

Arleigh Burke-class destroyers
Destroyers of the United States
Ships built in Pascagoula, Mississippi
1997 ships